There have been three baronetcies created for persons with the surname Clayton, two in the Baronetage of Great Britain and one in the Baronetage of the United Kingdom. One creation is extant as of 2021.

The Clayton baronetcy, of Marden Park in the County of Surrey, was created in the Baronetage of Great Britain on 13 January 1732 for William Clayton, Member of Parliament for Bletchingley. He was the nephew of Sir Robert Clayton, Lord Mayor of London in 1679. Clayton was succeeded by his son Kenrick, the second Baronet, who also represented Bletchingley in the House of Commons. His son Robert, the third Baronet, was Member of Parliament for Bletchingley, Surrey and Ilchester. He was childless and was succeeded by his first cousin William, the fourth Baronet, who was the son of William Clayton, younger son of the first Baronet. Clayton notably served as High Sheriff of Buckinghamshire. His second son East was created a baronet, of Hall Place, in his own right in 1838 (see below). Clayton was succeeded by his eldest son William Robert, the 5th Baronet. He was a General in the Army and fought at the Battle of Waterloo. He also represented Great Marlow in Parliament.

On his death the title passed to his grandson, the sixth Baronet (the son of Captain William Capel Clayton). He was High Sheriff of Buckinghamshire and Norfolk. He was childless and on his death in 1914 the title passed to his second cousin Sir Gilbert Clayton-East, 3rd Baronet, Hall Place (see below for earlier history of this title), who became the seventh Baronet of Marden Park as well. In 1870 he had assumed the surname of Clayton-East in lieu of Gilbert-East. His grandson, the 9th/5th Baronet, assumed in 1932 by deed poll the surname of Clayton-East-Clayton in lieu of Clayton-East. However, on his early death the same year, the line of the second son of the fourth Baronet failed and the baronetcy of Hall Place became extinct. The late Baronet was succeeded in the baronetcy of Marden Park by his second cousin twice removed, the tenth Baronet. He was the son of Sir FitzRoy Augustus Talbot Clayton, son of Reverend Augustus Philip Clayton, fifth and youngest son of the 4th Baronet. As of 2021, the title is held by the 10th Baronet's great-grandson, the 13th Baronet, who succeeded his father in that year.

The Clayton baronetcy, of Adlington in the County Palatine of Lancaster, was created in the Baronetage of Great Britain on 19 May 1774 for Richard Clayton, with remainder, failing heirs male of his own, to the heirs male of his father. Clayton notably served as British Consul in Nantes and as a Recorder of Wigan. He died without male issue and was succeeded according to the special remainder by his younger brother, the second Baronet. He was childless and on his death in 1839 the baronetcy became extinct.

The Clayton-East, later Gilbert-East, later Clayton-East-Clayton baronetcy, of Hall Place in the County of Berkshire, was created in the Baronetage of the United Kingdom on 17 August 1838 for East Clayton-East. Born East Clayton, he was the second son of the fourth Baronet of the 1732 creation and his wife Mary, daughter of Sir William East, 1st Baronet, of Hall Place, a title which had become extinct on the death of the latter's son, the second Baronet, in 1828 (see East baronets). East Clayton succeeded to the East estates on the death of his uncle in 1828 and assumed the following year the additional surname of East. In 1838, the baronetcy of Hall Place was revived in his favour. He was succeeded by his eldest son, the second Baronet. In 1839 he assumed for his lifetime only by royal licence the surname of Gilbert-East in lieu of Clayton-East. On his death the title passed to his son, the aforementioned third Baronet, who in 1914 succeeded in the baronetcy of Marden Park. See above for further history of the title.

Clayton, Clayton-East, Clayton-East-Clayton baronets, of Marden Park (1732)
Sir William Clayton, 1st Baronet (died 1744)
Sir Kenrick Clayton, 2nd Baronet ( – 1769)
Sir Robert Clayton, 3rd Baronet (c. 1740 – 1799)
Sir William Clayton, 4th Baronet (1762–1834)
General Sir William Robert Clayton, 5th Baronet (1786–1866)
Sir William Robert Clayton, 6th Baronet (1842–1914)
Sir Gilbert Augustus Clayton-East, 7th Baronet Clayton, of Marden (1846–1925)
Sir George Frederick Lancelot Clayton-East, 8th Baronet, of Marden (1872–1926)
Sir Robert Alan Clayton-East-Clayton, 9th Baronet Clayton, of Marden (1908–1932)
Sir Harold Dudley Clayton, 10th Baronet Clayton, of Marden (1877–1951)
Sir Arthur Harold Clayton, 11th Baronet Clayton, of Marden (1903–1985)
Sir David Robert Clayton, 12th Baronet Clayton, of Marden (1936–2021)
Sir Robert Philip Clayton, 13th Baronet Clayton, of Marden (born 1975)

The heir apparent is the current holder's son, William Robert Clayton (born 2008)

Clayton baronets, of Adlington (1774)
Sir Richard Clayton, 1st Baronet (c. 1745 – 1828)
Sir Robert Clayton, 2nd Baronet (1746–1839)

Clayton-East, Gilbert-East, Clayton-East-Clayton baronets, of Hall Place, Maidenhead (1838)
Sir East George Clayton-East, 1st Baronet of Hall Place, Maidenhead (1794–1851)
Sir Gilbert East Gilbert-East, 2nd Baronet of Hall Place, Maidenhead (1823–1866)
Sir Gilbert Augustus Clayton-East, 3rd Baronet of Hall Place, Maidenhead (1846–1925)
Sir George Frederick Lancelot Clayton-East, 4th Baronet of Hall Place, Maidenhead (1872–1926)
Sir Robert Alan Clayton East-Clayton, 5th Baronet of Hall Place, Maidenhead (1908–1932)

As Sir Robert died without issue, the baronetcy became extinct. Hall Place, Maidenhead, was sold by Sir Robert's mother in 1948, and is now the home of the Berkshire College of Agriculture.

Sir Robert and his wife Dorothy were the basis for the characters of Geoffrey and Katharine Clifton in The English Patient.

Male-line family tree

References

Sources
Kidd, Charles, Williamson, David (editors). Debrett's Peerage and Baronetage (1990 edition). New York: St Martin's Press, 1990.

External links
Official Site for the East-Claytons' ancestral seat, Hall Place, Maidenhead
"History of Hall Place" Berkshire College of Agriculture

Baronetcies in the Baronetage of Great Britain
Extinct baronetcies in the Baronetage of Great Britain
Extinct baronetcies in the Baronetage of the United Kingdom
1732 establishments in Great Britain
1774 establishments in Great Britain
1838 establishments in the United Kingdom
Baronetcies created with special remainders